There are several articles for the term: "Crackout".

Video Games:
Crackout (video game) - The Breakout clone, released on the NES by Konami.
Krakout - The Breakout clone released by Gremlin Graphics for various 8-Bit home computers.

Music:
Crackout (Band)